The 1954 Mississippi State Maroons football team represented Mississippi State College during the 1954 college football season. This was the first season as head coach for Darrell Royal, who had previously served as an assistant for the Maroons. Royal would later win three national championships as head coach of Texas. Center Hal Easterwood was named to the FWAA/Look All-America team. Halfback Art Davis was named SEC "Player of the Year" by the Nashville Banner and Atlanta Constitution.

Schedule

References

Mississippi State
Mississippi State Bulldogs football seasons
Mississippi State Maroons football